is a passenger railway station in the city of Funabashi, Chiba, Japan, operated by East Japan Railway Company (JR East).

Lines

Station layout
The station consists of an elevated island platform serving two tracks, with an elevated station building. The station is staffed.

History
Higashi-Funabashi Station opened on 1 October 1981.

Passenger statistics
In fiscal 2019, the station was used by an average of 20,542 passengers daily (boarding passengers only).

Surrounding area
 
Chiba Prefectural Funabashi High School

See also
 List of railway stations in Japan

References

External links

 Higashi-Funabashi Station information (JR East) 

Railway stations in Japan opened in 1981
Railway stations in Chiba Prefecture
Funabashi